The Bulgaria men's national tennis team represents Bulgaria in Davis Cup tennis competition and is governed by the Bulgarian Tennis Federation.

In the 2023 edition of the tournament Bulgaria defeated New Zealand in the World Group I Play-offs. With that win the team qualified for the World Group I for the first time in the team's history

History
Bulgaria made their Davis Cup debut in 1964. Their best performances came in the mid-1980s when they reached the Europe/Africa Zone Group I semifinals in two consecutive years - 1986 and 1987.

Current team
Player information and rankings 

The following players were called up for the World Group I Play-offs tie against New Zealand in February 2023.

Recent callups

Recent performances
Here is the list of all match-ups since 1981, when the competition started being held in the current World Group format.

1980s

1990s

2000s

2010s

2020s

Team representatives 
This is a list of tennis players who have represented the Bulgaria Davis Cup team in an official Davis Cup match.

See also
Davis Cup
Bulgaria Fed Cup team

External links

Davis Cup teams
Davis Cup
Davis Cup